David Carmona Sierra (born 11 January 1997) is a Spanish professional footballer who plays for Greek Super League club Asteras Tripolis as a right back.

Club career
Born in Palma del Río, Córdoba, Andalusia, Carmona joined Sevilla FC's youth setup in 2006 at the age of nine. On 26 October 2014, aged only 17, he made his senior debut for the reserves by coming on as a second-half substitute in a 1–3 Segunda División B home loss against Cádiz CF.

On 10 July 2015, Carmona renewed his contract until 2019. On 14 May of the following year, he made his first team – and La Liga – debut, starting in a 1–3 away loss against Athletic Bilbao.

Carmona scored his first professional goal on 8 January 2017, netting his team's fourth in a 5–3 home win against Real Oviedo. On 29 June of the following year, he signed a three-year deal with fellow second division side Cádiz CF.

On 15 July 2019, after being rarely used the previous campaign, Carmona joined fellow second division side Racing de Santander on a one-year loan deal. On 2 October of the following year, he terminated his contract with his parent club, and joined Real Betis' B-team the following day.

On 26 June 2021, Carmona, after he was released from Betis B, signed a three-year contract with Greek Super League club Asteras Tripolis.

Career statistics

References

External links

1997 births
Living people
Sportspeople from the Province of Córdoba (Spain)
Spanish footballers
Spanish expatriate footballers
Spanish expatriate sportspeople in Greece
Expatriate footballers in Greece
Footballers from Andalusia
Association football defenders
La Liga players
Segunda División players
Segunda División B players
Super League Greece players
Sevilla Atlético players
Sevilla FC players
Cádiz CF players
Racing de Santander players
Asteras Tripolis F.C. players
Betis Deportivo Balompié footballers
Spain youth international footballers
Spain under-21 international footballers